Georgia sent competitors to the 2018 Winter Paralympics in Pyeongchang, South Korea. The team has two people who are competing in para-Nordic skiing.  One is a man and one is a woman.

Team 
Georgia leaves to go to  Pyeongchang on March 6.  Georgia, North Korea and Tajikistan are the three countries making their first appearance Winter Paralympics.

The table below contains the list of members of people (called "Team Georgia") that will be participating in the 2018 Games.

Para-Nordic skiing

Skiers 
Temuri Dadiani competes in three sports: cycling, wheelchair fencing and para-Nordic skiing. He competed in cycling at the 2017 Invictus Games. He has a Guinness World Record.  It is for doing 44 push-ups in one minute. Dadiani was in the military.  While an officer in Afghanistan in August 2011, he was hit by a landmine.  Doctors amputated both his legs.

Nino Sabashvili had a goal of winning a Paralympic medal.  Her first sport is para-armwrestling.  The sport is not on the program for the Summer or Winter Paralympic Games.  She started para-Nordic skiing so she could compete in a sport that is on the program.  She is very good at para-armwrestling. At the 2016 World Para Armwrestling Championships in Blagoevgrad, Bulgaria, she won two silver medals.

References 

Nations at the 2018 Winter Paralympics
2018
2018 in Georgian sport